The sixth season of the American reality television series Deadliest Catch commenced on the Discovery Channel in the United States on April 13, 2010, and concluded on July 27, 2010. The complete sixth season DVD was released in North America on November 2, 2010.

The season received high critical praise from critics, who commended its tasteful and intelligent handling of Captain Phil Harris' death and the series' emotionally powerful storytelling.

Reception

Ratings
"Slow Burn", the season premiere, received at the time the highest number of American household viewers in the show's history. The record would be surpassed by later episodes in the season, such as "Blown Off Course", "Empty Throne" (5.24 million), "Cain and Abel" (5.26), and "Redemption Day" (8.5).

Critical response
The season received critical acclaim from critics, largely due to the emotional storyline involving Captain Phil Harris, who died in February 2010 after suffering from a stroke. Scott Von Doviak of The A.V. Club stated that due to the passing of Captain Harris prior to the season, episodes from the sixth season became "some of the most riveting and emotionally wrenching episodes of any reality series in TV history." Reviewing the season's DVD release, Paul Mavis of DVD Talk considered it to be "[t]he most emotionally involving season of the series so far." Michael Hann of The Guardian, while reviewing the box set release of the first ten seasons, gave high praise to season six, considering it "one of the most profoundly moving series of TV episodes I’ve ever seen".

In reviewing "Redemption Day", Matt Zoller Seitz of Salon.com praised the series' handling of Capt. Harris' passing "with intelligence and taste", stating that "[a]t no point did the series succumb to dumb voyeurism. We’ve seen little trace of the P.T. Barnum mentality that powers most unscripted programs. Quite the contrary: “Deadliest Catch” has brought old-school documentary sobriety to a genre more often known for shamelessness." Seitz concluded that "'Deadliest Catch' is a Trojan Horse reality show, smuggling integrity into a morally bankrupt genre.

Accolades
For the 63rd Primetime Emmy Awards, the series won Outstanding Reality Program for the first time. Among crew members, the series' cinematography team won Outstanding Cinematography for Reality Programming, Bob Bronow won Outstanding Sound Mixing for Nonfiction Programming, and Josh Earl, Kelly Coskran, and Alex Durham won Outstanding Picture Editing for Reality Programming, all for the episode "Redemption Day".

Episodes

References

Deadliest Catch
2010 American television seasons